The isolated San Martin Tuxtla volcano is a shield volcano which rises above the Gulf of Mexico. It has had eruptions in historical times. It occurs in the Tuxtla volcanic field in Veracruz, Mexico. Lavas from San Martin vary between basanite and alkali basalt. Locally the volcano is also known as  Tiltépetl (Black mountain in the Nahuatl language).

Morphology
San Martin forms a broad shield volcano, it rises to a height of 1680 m and is capped by a 1 km wide summit crater which is 150 m in depth. The crater contains two pyroclastic cones that were the source of the large 1793 eruption. The flanks of the volcano are dotted with 250 pyroclastic cones and maars, some of which have been active in historical times. The volcano is currently densely forested.

Eruptions

1664 eruption: A large VEI 3 eruption occurred from the southeast flank. This led to evacuation.

1793 eruption: A large VEI 4 eruption came from two pyroclastic cones in the summit, it produced widespread ashfall and lava flows that ran down the northeast flank.

1794-1796 eruption: A small VEI 2 eruption that continued for two years started in May, 1794.

References

 Kobs Nawotniak, S. E., J, Espindola and L. Godinez, Spatio-temporal evolution of the Tuxtla Volcanic Field,  Journal of Volcanology and Geothermal Research, Volume 197, Issues 1–4, 30 November 2010, Pages 188–208 Abstract
 Volcanolive

External links

 Volcanoes of Los Tuxlas

Los Tuxtlas
Holocene shield volcanoes
Volcanoes of Veracruz